Triumph-Werke Nürnberg AG or TWN, was a German bicycle and motorcycle company. In 1886, Siegfried Bettmann founded the Triumph bicycle factory in Coventry, England, and in 1896 he founded a second bicycle factory in his native Nuremberg, Germany, under the same Triumph name. Both factories branched out into making motorcycles: the Coventry factory in 1902 and the Nuremberg factory in 1903.

In its early decades the Nuremberg factory produced models with the same 499 cc and 545 cc four-stroke engines as its sister plant in Coventry.

Confusion between motorcycles produced by the Coventry and Nuremberg Triumph companies led to the latter's products being renamed "Orial" for certain export markets. However, in the 1920s there was already an Orial motorcycle maker in Lyon, France, so the Nuremberg motorcycles were renamed again as "TWN", standing for Triumph Werke Nürnberg.

After 1913 the English and German factories diverged, with the Nuremberg works making motorcycles with 248 cc and 269 cc two-stroke engines. After the Second World War Triumph made successful models including the 200 cc Cornet split single two-stroke and the split-single 1 cylinder 350 cc Boss. A split single has one "divided" cylinder (with 2 bores) but only one common combustion chamber and spark plug. Triumph/TWN's production of split singles began with the BD250 in 1939 designed by Otto Rieze.

In 1956 Max Grundig took over the Nuremberg company, merged it with his Adler motorcycle and typewriter business and terminated motorcycle production under the Triumph and TWN names.

Models 

List of models which were manufactured in Nuremberg

See also
List of motorcycles of 1900 to 1909
List of motorcycles of the 1910s
List of motorcycles of the 1950s

References

External links
Triumph (TWN) Owners' Club
Meisterdinger von Nürnberg Triumph (TWN) webpages
Motorcycle Classics article on 1957 TWN 125cc split-single

Motorcycle manufacturers of Germany
Cycle manufacturers of Germany
Defunct companies of Germany
Manufacturing companies based in Nuremberg